Rhodoprasina mateji is a species of moth of the family Sphingidae. It is known from Hubei in China.

Adult males have a long antennae. The forewings are matt green and the basal third of the hindwing upperside is red.

References

Rhodoprasina
Moths described in 2006